The Honduras women's national under-17 football team is the national women's u-17 football team of Honduras and is overseen by the National Autonomous Federation of Football of Honduras.  The team is allowed to participate at the different UNCAF and CONCACAF women's tournaments; as well to the FIFA U-17 Women's World Cup, although they haven't been able to qualify as of yet.

Competitive record

Head to head
 As of 28 October 2017

See also 
 Football in Honduras

External links
Official website
FIFA profile

Central American national under-17 association football teams
Women's national under-17 association football teams
W